High Watch, formerly named as Holiday House and also known as the Harkness House locally, is an  home situated in Watch Hill, a US historic district in Westerly, Rhode Island. It is a Colonial-style mansion sitting on a  seafront estate with a private beach, and is the most expensive private home in Rhode Island, valued at $17.75 million in 2013.

Built in 1929-1930 for the Snowden family, High Watch has been owned by American singer-songwriter Taylor Swift since 2013, and has been a subject of publicity, media attention, and controversy. Swift was well-known for throwing Independence Day parties at the house from 2013 to 2017, inviting several celebrities. Inspired by the house's history and a former owner, Rebekah Harkness, Swift released a song titled "The Last Great American Dynasty" from her eighth studio album Folklore (2020).

Design
Holiday House was built in 1929-1930 by "an eminent Philadelphia architect", in a "hulking Colonial style pile". The reception rooms include a 36-foot-long parlor, a 45-foot-long sun room, and an octagon-shaped formal dining room with built-in china cabinets. The kitchen reportedly contains a warming drawer and wine cooler, with an adjoining sitting room. There are four bedrooms on the second floor with en-suite bathrooms, and an expansive master suite with two bathrooms. The suite contains a sitting room with a wet bar as well as a widow's walk terrace. Lower levels include a recreation room, a service kitchen, a five-car garage, and a heated workshop. The estate also contains a swimming pool and a summer house.

History

Snowden family 
Holiday House was built in 1929-1930 for Mrs. George Grant Snowden (Pearl Pinkerton McClelland Snowden) of Philadelphia, whose husband had died in 1918. It stands as a landmark for sailors on the great bluff from which Watch Hill takes its name. Mrs. Snowden had acquired the historic and dramatic site from the estate of Eugene Atwood in 1929. Holiday House included a large servants quarters on what is now the northeast lawn. The servants quarters were demolished during extensive renovations carried out in the 1970s by Gurdon B. Wattles.

The Snowdens, beginning with George Grant Snowden's father, James McKean Snowden, who was born in 1831 and lived in Pittsburgh, had made their fortune in oil and gas exploration. George Grant Snowden and his brother, James Hastings Snowden, explored for oil first in Pennsylvania and then in Texas, Louisiana, New Mexico, and Oklahoma.

The 1938 New England hurricane and associated storm surge caused significant damage to the hillside facing the ocean. In order to stabilize the badly eroded hillside, George Grant Snowden Jr. had thousands of granite boulders put in place, which remain there to this day.

The property was sold in 1948 to Mr. William Hale Harkness, heir to the Standard Oil Company fortune.

Harkness family 
Stephen Vanderburgh Harkness was a progenitor of the extended Harkness family. He and his step-brother, Henry Flagler, and John D. Rockefeller invested heavily in Rockefeller, Andrews & Flagler, the corporate forerunner to Standard Oil. Harkness became the second-largest shareholder, which made him extremely wealthy. Harkness was a silent partner, though he served on Standard Oil's Board of Directors until his 1888 death.

A half-brother of Vanderburgh Harkness, Daniel M. Harkness, was a trustee of Standard Oil and a very rich man (the equivalent of a billionaire in 2013 USD). The money was left to his son, William Lamon Harkness. William died in 1919, with $53,439,000, about 70% of which came from Standard Oil shares. In 2020 USD, the fortune would be worth $800,352,505.14.

William fathered two children with Edith Hale: Louise Hale Harkness (1898–1978) who married David Sinton Ingalls, and William Hale Harkness. In 1947, William Hale married Rebekah Semple West, who was previously married to Dickson Pierce. After William Hale Harkness died in 1954, Rebekah remarried twice: first to Dr. Benjamin Harrison Kean, then to Niels H. Lauersen.

Rebekah lived at Holiday House after it was sold by the Snowdens in 1948. She apparently was quite unpopular with her neighbors, doing unusual things such as cleaning her pool with champagne, and gambling with a wide ranged of guests, such as Spanish artist Salvador Dali. Rebekah used her late husband's fortune to support charitable causes, such as supporting the Joffrey Ballet. She withdrew funding when the Ballet refused to rename in her honor, and created her own dance company: Harkness Ballet, hiring most of the Joffrey Ballet's dancers. The Harkness Ballet closed in 1975. Rebekah also funded medical research. Locals today refer to the house as the Harkness House as well.

Gurdon B. Wattles 
The Gurdon B. Wattles family bought Holiday House in 1974, renaming it as High Watch. The Wattles family remained at High Watch until 1996.

Taylor Swift 

In 2013, American singer-songwriter Taylor Swift purchased High Watch, for US$17.75 million. From 2013 to 2017, Swift received widespread press coverage for hosting American Independence Day parties on the estate, featuring numerous celebrity guests and lavish decorations often depicted on Instagram. Cosmpolitan compared the parties to "legendary parties in the history of United States", such as the Met Gala and the Vanity Fair Oscars party, and called it one of the most exclusive invites in the US. Her 2016 party received much attention as her then-boyfriend, actor Tom Hiddleston, was seen wearing an "I (Heart) T.S" shirt. The parties attracted controversy from local Watch Hill residents, who complained about the influx of paparazzi into Watch Hill and the unsolicited attention Swift brings to the community. Other attendees included Emma Stone, Andrew Garfield, Ingrid Michaelson, Gigi Hadid, Martha Hunt, Nick Jonas, Joe Jonas, the Haim sisters, Serayah, Calvin Harris, Blake Lively, Ryan Reynolds, Ruby Rose, Karlie Kloss, Cara Delevingne, St. Vincent, Rachel Platten, Uzo Aduba, Ed Sheeran, and Halston Sage.

In 2014, she again faced criticism from the residents over a proposal to rebuild a seawall on her property, which would reportedly impede public access to the beach. Swift responded that she sought to repair damage from coastal erosion, and the area of seawall was on her private beach, which had been used by the public for years prior to her purchase. Following a lawsuit, in April 2017, the Rhode Island Supreme Court upheld a lower-court decision that  landowners in Westerly can put up fences to keep strangers off their beach. The attorney general's office and environmental groups argued that the land had been dedicated to the public more than a century ago, but the court disagreed, ruling that the beach is privately owned.

In 2015, inspired by High Watch, then-Governor of Rhode Island, Gina Raimondo, proposed a luxury tax on "pricey" second homes within the state worth over $1 million, which was referred to as the "Taylor Swift tax" in mainstream media. The tax was criticized and was eventually withdrawn. The tax was widely viewed as an obstacle for future tourism in the state, especially since people with second homes spent money without straining infrastructural resources like school systems. Raimondo defended the proposal as potentially adding $12 million to the state’s economy, but then withdrew it.

Swift held "secret sessions" at High Watch in 2014 and 2017, hosting listening parties for groups of fans prior to the release of her albums 1989 and Reputation, respectively. During sessions for Reputation, Swift recorded a live, piano version of a song from the album, "New Year's Day", which debuted on ABC in November 2017.

On April 2, 2019, a stolen car crashed into the estate's gates following a police chase that started in a neighboring town in Connecticut.

Swift has had several stalking, trespassing and home invasion incidents at the house since 2013. More than five separate cases have been reported by news outlets, with three in 2019 alone.

In 2020, Swift released her eighth studio album, Folklore, featuring a song about the house and life of Rebekah Harkness, entitled "The Last Great American Dynasty". The song also details parallels between Harkness' and Swift's unfavorable press reception at various points due to their personal lives and residence. The song was praised by critics for its lyricism and storytelling. In 2022, L'Officiel named High Watch as one of the most expensive celebrity homes in the Americas.

See also 

 Samuel Goldwyn Estate, another house owned by Swift.

References

Harkness family
Houses completed in 1930
Houses in Rhode Island
Houses in the United States
Taylor Swift